Van Diemen's Land is the former name for Tasmania.

It may also refer to:

 Darwin and Kimberley in northwestern Australia, an area known as Van Diemen's Land during the initial Dutch exploration of Australia
 Van Diemen's Land (album), a 2014 album by Russell Morris
 Van Diemen's Land (film), a film documenting Alexander Pearce's first escape
 Van Diemen's Land (folk song), a transportation ballad
 Van Diemen's Land (U2 song), a song by U2 from Rattle and Hum
 Van Diemen's Land Company, a farming corporation
 Van Diemen's Land Ensign, an unofficial merchant flag

See also
Van Diemen (disambiguation)
Bank of Van Diemen's Land
Van Diemen's Land v Port Phillip, 1851